The 1790–91 United States House of Representatives elections were held on various dates in various states between April 27, 1790, and October 11, 1791. Each state set its own date for its elections to the House of Representatives before the first session of the 2nd United States Congress convened on October 24, 1791. This was the first midterm election cycle, which took place in the middle of President George Washington's first term. The size of the House increased to 67 seats after the new state of Vermont elected its first representatives.

While formal political parties still did not exist, coalitions of pro-Washington (pro-Administration) representatives and anti-Administration representatives each gained two seats as a result of the addition of new states to the union.

Speaker Frederick Muhlenberg, who had led the Pro-Administrationists in 1789, switched loyalties to the Anti-Administrationists during the tenure of the 1st Congress. He failed to win election to the Speakership as their leader as a result of these elections, and was succeeded by Jonathan Trumbull Jr., who became the 2nd Speaker of the House.

Retirements 
Either five or six incumbents did not seek re-election.

Anti-Administration 

 Maryland 4: William Smith retired.
 Virginia 6: Isaac Coles retired.

Aedanus Burke, a U.S. representative from South Carolina's 2nd congressional district, either retired or lost re-election but it is not known

Pro-Administration 

 Pennsylvania at-large: George Clymer retired.
 Pennsylvania at-large: Henry Wynkoop retired.
 Pennsylvania at-large: Thomas Scott retired.

Election summaries 
In this period, each state fixed its own date for congressional general elections, a In this period, each state fixed its own date for congressional general elections early as April 27, 1790 (in New York) and as late as October 11, 1791 (in Pennsylvania). Elections to a Congress took place both in the even-numbered year before and in the odd-numbered year when the Congress convened. In some states, the congressional delegation was not elected until after the legal start of the Congress (on the 4th day of March in the odd-numbered year). The first session of this Congress was convened in Philadelphia on October 24, 1791.

Kentucky and Vermont became states during the 2nd Congress, adding two seats each. The legislation admitted Vermont was passed at the end of the 1st Congress taking effect on March 4, 1791, the first day of the 2nd Congress, so that Vermont was represented from the start of the Congress, while Kentucky was unrepresented until the 2nd session.

Change in composition

End of the last Congress

Beginning of the next Congress

Special elections 

There were special elections in 1790 and 1791 during the 1st United States Congress and 2nd United States Congress.
New states and newly-ratified states are not included as special elections.

Elections are sorted by date then district.

1st Congress 

|-
! 
| Theodorick Bland
|  | Anti-Administration
| 1789
|  | Incumbent died June 1, 1790.New member elected July 1790.Anti-Administration hold.Winner was later elected to the next term, see below.
| nowrap | 

|-
! 
| Pierpont Edwards
|  | Pro-Administration
| 1790
|  | Predecessor declined election.New member elected December 16, 1790.Pro-Administration hold.Winner had already been elected to the next term, see below.
| nowrap | 

|}

2nd Congress 

|-
! 
| colspan=3 | Vacant
|  | Representative-elect James Townsend (Pro-Administration) died May 24, 1790.New member elected April 26–28, 1791.Anti-Administration gain.
| nowrap | 

|-
! 
| Roger Sherman
|  | Pro-Administration
| 1790
|  | Incumbent-and-Representative-elect resigned March 31, 1791, to become U.S. Senator.New member elected September 19, 1791.Pro-Administration hold.
| nowrap | 

|-
! 
| William Pinkney
|  | Pro-Administration
| 1790
|  | Incumbent resigned.New member elected October 26–29, 1791.Anti-Administration gain.Winner seated February 5, 1792.
| nowrap | 

|}

Connecticut 

Connecticut elected all five of its representatives at-large on a general ticket on September 20, 1790.

|-
! rowspan=5 | 
| Roger Sherman
|  | Pro-Administration
| 1788
| Incumbent re-elected.Winner declined to serve and a new member would later be elected in a special election.
| nowrap rowspan=5 | 

|-
| Benjamin Huntington
|  | Pro-Administration
| 1788
|  | Incumbent lost re-election.New member elected.Pro-Administration hold.

|-
| Jonathan Sturges
|  | Pro-Administration
| 1788
| Incumbent re-elected.

|-
| Jonathan Trumbull Jr.
|  | Pro-Administration
| 1788
| Incumbent re-elected.

|-
| Jeremiah Wadsworth
|  | Pro-Administration
| 1788
|  | Incumbent lost re-election.New member elected.Pro-Administration hold.Winner declined to serve and the incumbent was re-elected in a special election.

|}

There were two subsequent special elections.  The first was held to fill the vacancy left by Pierpont Edwards (Pro-Administration) declining to serve and was won by Jeremiah Wadsworth (Pro-Administration).  The second was held September 19, 1791, to fill the vacancy left by Roger Sherman (Pro-Administration)'s election to the Senate and was won by Amasa Learned (Pro-Administration).

Delaware 

|-
! 
| John M. Vining
|  | Pro-Administration
| 1789
| Incumbent re-elected.
| nowrap | 

|}

Georgia 

Georgia switched to a conventional district system for the Second Congress.

|-
! 
| James Jackson
|  | Anti-Administration
| 1789
|  | Incumbent lost re-election.New member elected.Anti-Administration hold.Election was subsequently challenged, the House determined that electoral fraud had occurred, and the seat was declared void.
| nowrap | 

|-
! 
| Abraham Baldwin
|  | Anti-Administration
| 1789
| Incumbent re-elected.
| nowrap | 

|-
! 
| George Mathews
|  | Anti-Administration
| 1789
|  | Incumbent lost re-election.New member elected.Anti-Administration hold.
| nowrap | 

|}

Kentucky 

Kentucky was admitted during the 2nd Congress and elected its first representatives in 1792.

Maryland 

Under Maryland law for the election for the 1st and 2nd Congresses "candidates were elected at-large but had to be residents of a specific district with the statewide vote determining winners from each district."

|-
! 
| Michael J. Stone
|  | Anti-Administration
| 1789
|  | Incumbent lost re-election.New member elected.Pro-Administration gain.
| nowrap | 

|-
! 
| Joshua Seney
|  | Anti-Administration
| 1789
| Incumbent re-elected.
| nowrap | 

|-
! 
| Benjamin Contee
|  | Anti-Administration
| 1789
|  | Incumbent lost re-election.New member elected.Pro-Administration gain.Winner later resigned due to questions of ineligibility due to his residence and was replaced in a special election by John Francis Mercer (Anti-Administration).
| nowrap | 

|-
! 
| William Smith
|  | Anti-Administration
| 1789
|  | Incumbent retired.New member elected.Anti-Administration hold.
| nowrap | 

|-
! 
| George Gale
|  | Pro-Administration
| 1789
|  | Incumbent lost re-election.New member elected.Pro-Administration hold.
| nowrap | 

|-
! 
| Daniel Carroll
|  | Pro-Administration
| 1789
|  | Incumbent lost re-election.New member elected.Anti-Administration gain.
| nowrap | 

|}

Massachusetts 

Massachusetts law required a majority for election.  This condition was met in four of the eight districts, the remaining four required between 2 and 9 ballots for election.

|-
! 
| Fisher Ames
|  | Pro-Administration
| 1788
| Incumbent re-elected.
| nowrap | 

|-
! 
| Benjamin Goodhue
|  | Pro-Administration
| 1789
| Incumbent re-elected.
| nowrap | 

|-
! 
| Elbridge Gerry
|  | Anti-Administration
| 1789
| Incumbent re-elected.
| nowrap | 

|-
! 
| Theodore Sedgwick
|  | Pro-Administration
| 1789
| Incumbent re-elected.
| nowrap | 

|-
! 
| George Partridge
|  | Pro-Administration
| 1788
|  | Incumbent resigned August 14, 1790.New member elected.Pro-Administration hold.
| nowrap | ::

|-
! 
| George Leonard
|  | Pro-Administration
| 1788
| Incumbent re-elected.
| nowrap | :::::::::

|-
! 
| Jonathan Grout
|  | Anti-Administration
| 1789
|  | Incumbent lost re-election.New member elected.Pro-Administration gain.
| nowrap | ::

|-
! 
| George Thatcher
|  | Pro-Administration
| 1788
| Incumbent re-elected.
| nowrap | ::::

|}

New Hampshire 

|-
! rowspan=3 | 
| Abiel Foster
|  | Pro-Administration
| 1789 
|  | Incumbent lost re-election.New member elected.Pro-Administration hold.
| rowspan=3 nowrap | 

|-
| Samuel Livermore
|  | Anti-Administration
| 1789
|  | Incumbent re-elected as Pro-Administration.

|-
| Nicholas Gilman
|  | Pro-Administration
| 1789
| Incumbent re-elected.

|}

New Jersey 

|-
! rowspan=4 | 
| Elias Boudinot
|  | Pro-Administration
| 1789
| Incumbent re-elected.
| rowspan=4 nowrap | 

|-
| Lambert Cadwalader
|  | Pro-Administration
| 1789
|  | Incumbent lost re-election.New member elected.Pro-Administration hold.

|-
| James Schureman
|  | Pro-Administration
| 1789
|  | Incumbent lost re-election.New member elected.Pro-Administration hold.

|-
| Thomas Sinnickson
|  | Pro-Administration
| 1789
|  | Incumbent lost re-election.New member elected.Pro-Administration hold.

|}

New York 

New York's districts were not numbered at the time, therefore the numbering here is retroactive.

|-
! 
| William Floyd
|  | Anti-Administration
| 1789
|  | Incumbent lost re-election.New member elected.Pro-Administration gain.Winner died May 24, 1790, before the start of the 2nd Congress.  A special election was then held, see above.
| nowrap | 

|-
! 
| John Laurance
|  | Pro-Administration
| 1789
| Incumbent re-elected.
| nowrap | 

|-
! 
| Egbert Benson
|  | Pro-Administration
| 1789
| Incumbent re-elected.
| nowrap | 

|-
! 
| John Hathorn
|  | Anti-Administration
| 1789
|  | Incumbent lost re-election.New member elected.Anti-Administration hold.
| nowrap | 

|-
! 
| Peter Silvester
|  | Pro-Administration
| 1789
| Incumbent re-elected.
| nowrap | 

|-
! 
| Jeremiah Van Rensselaer
|  | Anti-Administration
| 1789
|  | Incumbent lost re-election.New member elected.Pro-Administration gain.
| nowrap | 

|}

North Carolina 

North Carolina ratified the Constitution November 21, 1789, and elected its representatives after admission.

1st Congress 

|-
! 
| colspan=3 | State ratified the U.S. Constitution November 21, 1789.
|  | First member elected March 24, 1790.Anti-Administration win.Winner was later elected to the next term, see below.
| nowrap | 

|-
! 
| colspan=3 | State ratified the U.S. Constitution November 21, 1789.
|  | First member elected March 24, 1790.Anti-Administration win.Winner was later elected to the next term, see below.
| nowrap | 

|-
! 
| colspan=3 | State ratified the U.S. Constitution November 21, 1789.
|  | First member elected March 24, 1790.Anti-Administration win.Winner later lost re-election to the next term, see below.
| nowrap | 

|-
! 
| colspan=3 | State ratified the U.S. Constitution November 21, 1789.
|  | First member elected March 24, 1790.Pro-Administration win.Winner was later elected to the next term, see below.
| nowrap | 

|-
! 
| colspan=3 | State ratified the U.S. Constitution November 21, 1789.
|  | First member elected March 24, 1790.Pro-Administration win.District covered areas beyond the Appalachian Mountains that were ceded to in May 1790 to form the Southwest Territory, but member retained seat for the remainder of term.
| nowrap | 

|}

2nd Congress 

Due to the cession of North Carolina's trans-Appalachian territory to form the Southwest Territory, the territory of the old  was lost.  North Carolina retained the same number of Representatives, and so it redistricted for the Second Congress.

|-
! 
| John Steele
|  | Pro-Administration
| 1790
| Incumbent re-elected.
| nowrap | 

|-
! 
| colspan=3 | None (District created)
|  | New seatAnti-Administration gain.
| nowrap | 

|-
! 
| John Baptista Ashe
|  | Anti-Administration
| 1790
| Incumbent re-elected.
| nowrap | 

|-
! 
| Hugh Williamson
|  | Anti-Administration
| 1790
| Incumbent re-elected.
| nowrap | 

|-
! 
| Timothy Bloodworth
|  | Anti-Administration
| 1790
|  | Incumbent lost re-election.New member elected.Pro-Administration gain.
| nowrap | 

|}

Pennsylvania 

Pennsylvania had elected its Representatives at-large in the 1st Congress, but switched to using districts in the 2nd Congress.  Five incumbents ran for re-election, four of whom won, while three others retired leaving three open seats.  Two districts had no incumbents residing in them, while one (the ) had a single representative who declined to run for re-election and one (the ) had three incumbents, only one of whom ran for re-election.

|-
! 
| Thomas Fitzsimons
|  | Pro-Administration
| 1788
| Incumbent re-elected.
| nowrap | 

|-
! rowspan=3 | 
| Frederick Muhlenberg
|  | Pro-Administration
| 1788
|  | Incumbent re-elected as Anti-Administration.
| rowspan=3 valign=top | 

|-
| George Clymer
|  | Pro-Administration
| 1788
|  | Incumbent retired.Pro-Administration loss.

|-
| Henry Wynkoop
|  | Pro-Administration
| 1788
|  | Incumbent retired.Pro-Administration loss.

|-
! 
| Peter Muhlenberg
|  | Anti-Administration
| 1788
|  | Incumbent lost re-election.New member elected.Pro-Administration gain.
| nowrap | 

|-
! 
| Daniel Hiester
|  | Anti-Administration
| 1788
| Incumbent re-elected.
| nowrap | 

|-
! 
| colspan=3 | None (District created)
|  | New seat.New member elected.Pro-Administration gain.
| nowrap | 

|-
! 
| colspan=3 | None (District created)
|  | New seat.New member elected.Anti-Administration gain.
| nowrap | 

|-
! 
| Thomas Hartley
|  | Pro-Administration
| 1788
| Incumbent re-elected.
| nowrap | 

|-
! 
| Thomas Scott
|  | Pro-Administration
| 1788
|  | Incumbent retired.New member elected.Anti-Administration gain.
| nowrap | 

|}

Rhode Island

1st Congress 

Rhode Island ratified the Constitution May 29, 1790.  It elected its representatives after admission.

|-
! 
| colspan=3 | State ratified the U.S. Constitution May 29, 1790.
|  | First member elected August 31, 1790.Pro-Administration win.Winner was later elected to the next term, see below.
| nowrap | 

|}

2nd Congress 

Rhode Island held elections for the 2nd Congress on October 18, 1790, about six weeks after elections for the 1st Congress due to the state's late ratification of the Constitution.

|-
! 
| Benjamin Bourne
|  | Pro-Administration
| August 1790
| Incumbent re-elected.
| nowrap | 

|}

South Carolina 

|-
! 
| William L. Smith
|  | Pro-Administration
| 1788
| Incumbent re-elected.
| nowrap | 

|-
! 
| Aedanus Burke
|  | Anti-Administration
| 1788
|  | Unknown if incumbent retired or lost re-election.New member elected.Pro-Administration gain.
| nowrap | 

|-
! 
| Daniel Huger
|  | Pro-Administration
| 1788
| Incumbent re-elected.
| nowrap | 

|-
! 
| Thomas Sumter
|  | Anti-Administration
| 1788
| Incumbent re-elected.
| nowrap | 

|-
! 
| Thomas Tudor Tucker
|  | Anti-Administration
| 1788
| Incumbent re-elected.
| nowrap | 

|}

Vermont 

Vermont was admitted at the end of the First Congress, with the admission taking effect at the start of the Second Congress. Vermont was entitled to elect two representatives. Vermont law at the time required a majority to win an office.

|-
! 
| colspan=3 | New state admitted.
|  | First member elected.Anti-Administration win.
| nowrap | ::

|-
! 
| colspan=3 | New state admitted.
|  | First member elected.Anti-Administration win.
| nowrap | 

|}

Virginia 

|-
! 
| Alexander White
|  | Pro-Administration
| 1789
| Incumbent re-elected.
| nowrap | 

|-
! 
| John Brown
|  | Anti-Administration
| 1789
| Incumbent re-elected.
| nowrap | 

|-
! 
| Andrew Moore
|  | Anti-Administration
| 1789
| Incumbent re-elected.
| nowrap | 

|-
! 
| Richard Bland Lee
|  | Pro-Administration
| 1789
| Incumbent re-elected.
| nowrap | 

|-
! 
| James Madison
|  | Anti-Administration
| 1789
| Incumbent re-elected.
| nowrap | 

|-
! 
| Isaac Coles
|  | Anti-Administration
| 1789
|  | Incumbent retired.New member elected.Anti-Administration hold.
| nowrap | 

|-
! 
| John Page
|  | Anti-Administration
| 1789
| Incumbent re-elected.
| nowrap | 

|-
! 
| Josiah Parker
|  | Anti-Administration
| 1789
| Incumbent re-elected.
| nowrap | 

|-
! 
| William B. Giles
|  | Anti-Administration
| 1790 
| Incumbent re-elected.
| nowrap | 

|-
! 
| Samuel Griffin
|  | Pro-Administration
| 1789
|  | Incumbent re-elected as Anti-Administration.
| nowrap | 

|}

See also
 1790 United States elections
 List of United States House of Representatives elections (1789–1822)
 1790–91 United States Senate elections
 1st United States Congress
 2nd United States Congress

Notes

References

Bibliography

External links
 Office of the Historian (Office of Art & Archives, Office of the Clerk, U.S. House of Representatives)